Bolado is a surname of Spanish origin and may refer to:

Carlos Bolado (born 1964), a Mexican filmmaker
Carlos Vidal Bolado (1914–1996), a Cuban conga drummer
Cris Bolado (1969 – 2017), a Filipino professional basketball player
Iván Bolado (born 1989), a Spanish-born Equatoguinean footballer 
Pablo Bolados (born 1978), a Chilean footballer

Surnames